Fiston Abdul Razak (born 5 September 1993) is a Burundian professional footballer who currently plays for Olympique de Khouribga and the Burundi national team as a striker.

Club career

Before join JS Kabylie, he played successively for LLB Académic FC, Rayon Sports F.C., CSMD Diables Noirs, Sofapaka F.C., Mamelodi Sundowns F.C., Bloemfontein Celtic F.C., C.D. Primeiro de Agosto and Al-Zawra'a SC.

International career
Abdul Razak was named in the Burundi national team squad to represent the nation at the 2014 African Nations Championship held in South Africa.

International goals
Scores and results list Burundi's goal tally first.

Honours

Club
Mamelodi Sundowns F.C.
Telkom Knockout: 2015
Al-Zawraa
Iraqi Premier League: 2017–18

References

External links
 Fiston Abdul Razak at Footballdatabase

1993 births
Living people
Sportspeople from Bujumbura
Burundian footballers
Burundi international footballers
Burundian expatriate footballers
Kenyan Premier League players
Sofapaka F.C. players
Expatriate footballers in Kenya
Mamelodi Sundowns F.C. players
Expatriate soccer players in South Africa
Association football forwards
2014 African Nations Championship players
2019 Africa Cup of Nations players
Burundi A' international footballers
Burundian expatriate sportspeople in South Africa
Burundian expatriate sportspeople in Kenya
Burundian expatriate sportspeople in Angola
Burundian expatriate sportspeople in Tanzania
Burundian expatriate sportspeople in Algeria
Burundian expatriate sportspeople in Morocco
Expatriate footballers in Angola
Expatriate footballers in Algeria
Expatriate footballers in Tanzania
Expatriate footballers in Rwanda
Expatriate footballers in Iraq
Burundian expatriate sportspeople in Rwanda
Burundian expatriate sportspeople in Iraq